Sir Richard Charles Nicholas Branson (born 18 July 1950) is a British billionaire, entrepreneur, commercial astronaut and business magnate. In the 1970s he founded the Virgin Group, which today controls more than 400 companies in various fields.

Branson expressed his desire to become an entrepreneur at a young age. His first business venture, at the age of 16, was a magazine called Student. In 1970, he set up a mail-order record business. He opened a chain of record stores, Virgin Records—later known as Virgin Megastores—in 1972. Branson's Virgin brand grew rapidly during the 1980s, as he started the Virgin Atlantic airline and expanded the Virgin Records music label. In 1997, Branson founded the Virgin Rail Group to bid for passenger rail franchises during the privatisation of British Rail. The Virgin Trains brand operated the InterCity West Coast franchise from 1997 to 2019, the InterCity CrossCountry franchise from 1997 to 2007, and the InterCity East Coast franchise from 2015 to 2018. In 2004, he founded spaceflight corporation Virgin Galactic, based at Mojave Air and Space Port in California, noted for the SpaceShipTwo suborbital spaceplane designed for space tourism.

In March 2000, Branson was knighted at Buckingham Palace for "services to entrepreneurship". For his work in retail, music and transport (with interests in land, air, sea and space travel), his taste for adventure and for his humanitarian work, he has become a prominent global figure. In 2007, he was placed in the Time 100 Most Influential People in the World list. In July 2021, Forbes listed Branson's estimated net worth at US$5.7 billion.

On 11 July 2021, Branson travelled as a passenger onboard Virgin Galactic Unity 22 at the edge of space, a suborbital test flight for his spaceflight company Virgin Galactic. At 70, Branson became the third oldest person to fly to space.

Early life
Branson was born in Blackheath, London, the son of Edward James Branson (1918–2011), a barrister, and his wife Eve Branson (née Evette Huntley Flindt; 1924–2021), a former ballet dancer and air hostess. He has two younger sisters, Lindy Branson and Vanessa Branson. His grandfather, Sir George Arthur Harwin Branson, was a judge of the High Court of Justice and a Privy Councillor.

Branson's great-great-great-grandfather, John Edward Branson, left England for India in 1793; John Edward's father, Harry Wilkins Branson, later joined his son in Madras. Starting from 1793, four generations of Branson's family lived in India, mostly at Cuddalore Tamilnadu. On the show Finding Your Roots, Branson was shown to have 3.9% South Asian (Indian) DNA, likely through intermarriage. Later, he stated that one of his great-great-great-grandmothers was an Indian named Ariya.

Branson was educated at Scaitcliffe School, a prep school in Surrey, before briefly attending Cliff View House School in Sussex. He attended Stowe School, a private school in Buckinghamshire until the age of sixteen.

Branson has dyslexia, and had poor academic performance; on his last day at school, his headmaster, Robert Drayson, told him he would either end up in prison or become a millionaire. 
Branson has also talked openly about having ADHD.
Branson's parents were supportive of his endeavours from an early age. His mother was an entrepreneur; one of her most successful ventures was building and selling wooden tissue boxes and wastepaper bins. In London, he started off squatting from 1967 to 1968.

Early business career 
After failed attempts to grow and sell both Christmas trees and budgerigars, Branson launched a magazine named Student in 1966 with Nik Powell. The first issue of Student appeared in January 1968, and a year later, Branson's net worth was estimated at £50,000. The office for the venture was situated in the crypt of St. John's Church, off Bayswater Road, in London.  Though not initially as successful as he hoped, the magazine later became a vital component of the mail-order record business Branson started from the same church he used for Student. Branson used the magazine to advertise popular albums, driving his record sales. He interviewed several prominent personalities of the late 1960s for the magazine including Mick Jagger and R. D. Laing. Branson took over full direction of Student after successfully bluffing to Powell that the workers at the magazine opposed Powell's plans to turn the magazine into a cooperative.

His business sold records for considerably less than the "High Street" outlets, especially the chain WHSmith. Branson once said, "There is no point in starting your own business unless you do it out of a sense of frustration." At the time, many products were sold under restrictive marketing agreements that limited discounting, despite efforts in the 1950s and 1960s to limit retail price maintenance.

Branson eventually started a record shop in Oxford Street in London. In 1971, he was questioned in connection with the selling of records declared export stock. The matter was never brought before a court because Branson agreed to repay any unpaid purchase tax of 33% and a £70,000 fine. His parents re-mortgaged the family home to help pay the settlement.

Virgin

1972–1980: Founding of Virgin Records

In 1972, using money earned from his record store, Branson launched the record label Virgin Records with Nik Powell. The name "Virgin" was suggested by one of Branson's early employees because they were all new at business. Branson bought a country estate north of Oxford in which he installed a residential recording studio, The Manor Studio. He leased studio time to fledgling artists, including multi-instrumentalist Mike Oldfield, whose debut album Tubular Bells (1973) was the first release for Virgin Records and became a chart-topping best-seller.

Virgin signed controversial bands such as the Sex Pistols, which other companies were reluctant to sign. Virgin Records would go on to sign other artists including the Rolling Stones, Peter Gabriel, XTC, Japan, UB40, Steve Winwood and Paula Abdul, and to become the world's largest independent record label. It also won praise for exposing the public to such lesser known avant-garde music as Faust and Can. Virgin Records also introduced Culture Club to the music world.

Branson's net worth was estimated at £5 million by 1979, and a year later, Virgin Records went international.

1981–1987: Package holiday industries and Virgin Atlantic 

Branson's first successful entry into the airline industry was during a trip to Puerto Rico. His flight was cancelled, so he decided to charter his own plane the rest of the way and offered a ride to the rest of the stranded passengers for a small fee to cover the cost.

In 1982, Virgin purchased the gay bar Heaven. In 1991, in a consortium with David Frost, Branson made an unsuccessful bid for three ITV franchises under the CPV-TV name. The early 1980s also saw his only attempt as a producer—on the novelty record "Baa, Baa, Black Sheep", by The Singing Sheep in association with Doug McLean and Grace McDonald, on which he was credited as "Jeff Mutton". The track consisted of samples of animal noises recorded at his aunt Claire Hoares' farm in Norfolk, set to a drum-machine-produced track and reached number 42 in the UK charts in 1982.

Branson formed Virgin Atlantic and Virgin Cargo in 1984. He formed Virgin Holidays in 1985.

1988–2000: Telecoms ventures, railways, and worldwide impact 

In 1992, to keep his airline company afloat, Branson sold the Virgin label to EMI for £500 million. Branson said that he wept when the sale was completed because the record business had been the very start of the Virgin empire. He created V2 Records in 1996 to re-enter the music business, owning 5% himself. Virgin also acquired European short-haul airline Euro Belgian Airlines and renamed it Virgin Express. In 1997, Branson took what many saw as being one of his riskier business exploits by entering into the railway business during the privatisation of British Rail in the late 1990s. Virgin Rail Group won the InterCity CrossCountry and InterCity West Coast franchises, beginning operations in January and March 1997 respectively. Both franchises were scheduled to run for 15 years.

A series of disputes in the early 1990s caused tension between Virgin Atlantic and British Airways, which viewed Virgin as an emerging competitor. Virgin subsequently accused British Airways of poaching its passengers, hacking its computers, and leaking stories to the press that portrayed Virgin negatively. After the so-called campaign of "dirty tricks", British Airways settled the case, giving £500,000 to Branson, a further £110,000 to his airline, and had to pay legal fees of up to £3 million. Branson distributed his compensation (the so-called "BA bonus") among his staff.

Branson launched Virgin Mobile in 1999, and airline Virgin Blue in Australia in 2000.

2001–2007: Entry into space travel and Virgin Media 

On 25 September 2004, Branson announced the signing of a deal under which a new space tourism company, Virgin Galactic, will license the technology behind SpaceShipOne—funded by Microsoft co-founder Paul Allen and designed by aeronautical engineer Burt Rutan—to take paying passengers into suborbital outer space. Virgin Galactic plans to make flights available to the public with tickets priced at US$200,000 using the Scaled Composites White Knight Two. The spacecraft, SpaceShipTwo, is manufactured by The Spaceship Company, which was founded by Branson and Rutan and is now solely owned by Virgin Galactic. In 2013, Branson said that he planned to take his two children, 31-year-old Holly and 28-year-old Sam, on a trip to outer space when they ride the SpaceShipTwo rocket plane on its first public flight, then planned for 2014. As part of his promotion of the firm, Branson has added a variation of the Virgin Galactic livery to his personal business jet, the Dassault Falcon 900EX "Galactic Girl" (G-GALX).

He was ninth in The Sunday Times Rich List 2006 of the wealthiest people or families in the UK, worth slightly more than £3 billion. Branson wrote in his autobiography of the decision to start an airline.

In 2006, through a merger with SN Brussels Airlines, Virgin Airlines formed Brussels Airlines, while retaining its separate listing. It also started a national airline based in Nigeria, called Virgin Nigeria, which ceased operations in 2009. Another airline, Virgin America, began flying out of San Francisco International Airport in August 2007.

Branson's next venture with the Virgin group was Virgin Fuels, which was set up to respond to global warming and exploit the recent spike in fuel costs by offering a revolutionary, cheaper fuel for automobiles and, in the near future, aircraft. Branson has stated that he was formerly a global warming sceptic and was influenced in his decision by a breakfast meeting with Al Gore.

On 21 September 2006, Branson pledged to invest the profits of Virgin Atlantic and Virgin Trains in research for environmentally-friendly fuels. The investment is estimated to be worth $3 billion.

On 4 July 2006, Branson sold his Virgin Mobile company to UK cable TV, broadband, and telephone company NTL:Telewest for £900million. A new company was launched with much fanfare and publicity on 8 February 2007, under the name Virgin Media. The decision to merge his Virgin Media Company with NTL was made in order to integrate compatible areas of the two businesses. Whilst Branson had owned three-quarters of Virgin Mobile, he would now get  paid £8.5million per annum for the use of the Virgin brand name. He does not own any part of Virgin Media.

In 2006, Branson formed Virgin Comics and Virgin Animation, an entertainment company focused on creating new stories and characters for a global audience. The company was founded with author Deepak Chopra, filmmaker Shekhar Kapur, and entrepreneurs Sharad Devarajan and Gotham Chopra. Branson also launched the Virgin Health Bank on 1 February 2007, offering parents-to-be the opportunity to store their baby's umbilical cord blood stem cells in private and public stem-cell banks.

In June 2006, a tip-off from Virgin Atlantic led both UK and US competition authorities to investigate price-fixing attempts between Virgin Atlantic and British Airways. In August 2007, British Airways was fined £271 million over the allegations. Virgin Atlantic was given immunity for tipping off the authorities and received no fine—a controversial decision the Office of Fair Trading defended as being in the public interest.

On 9 February 2007, Branson announced the setting up of a new global science and technology prize—The Virgin Earth Challenge—in the belief that history has shown that prizes of this nature encourage technological advancements for the good of mankind. The Virgin Earth Challenge was to award $25 million to the individual or group who are able to demonstrate a commercially viable design that will result in the net removal of anthropogenic, atmospheric greenhouse gases each year for at least ten years without countervailing harmful effects. This removal must have long-term effects and contribute materially to the stability of the Earth's climate. Branson also announced that he would be joined in the adjudication of the prize by a panel of five judges, all world authorities in their respective fields: Al Gore, Sir Crispin Tickell, Tim Flannery, James E. Hansen, and James Lovelock.

In July 2007, Branson purchased his Australian home, Makepeace Island, in Noosa. In August 2007, Branson announced that he had bought a 20-percent stake in Malaysia's AirAsia X.

On 13 October 2007, Branson's Virgin Group sought to add Northern Rock to its empire after submitting an offer that would result in Branson personally owning 30% of the company and changing the company's name from Northern Rock to Virgin Money. The Daily Mail ran a campaign against his bid; Vince Cable, financial spokesperson for the Liberal Democrats, suggested in the House of Commons that Branson's criminal conviction for tax evasion might be felt by some as a good enough reason not to trust him with public money.

2008–2019: Hotels, healthcare and charitable influence 
On 9 January 2008, Virgin Healthcare announced that it would open a chain of health care clinics that would offer conventional medical care alongside homeopathic and complementary therapies, a development that was welcomed by Ben Bradshaw, the UK's health minister.

Plans where GPs could be paid for referring National Health Service (NHS) patients to private Virgin services were abandoned in June 2008. The BMA warned the plan would "damage clinical objectivity", there would be a financial incentive for GPs to push patients toward the Virgin services at the centre. Plans to take over an NHS Practice in Swindon were abandoned in late September 2008.

In February 2009, Branson's Virgin organization was reported as bidding to buy the former Honda Formula One team. Branson later stated an interest in Formula One, but claimed that, before the Virgin brand became involved with Honda or any other team, Formula One would have to develop a more economically efficient and environmentally responsible image. At the start of the 2009 Formula One season on 28 March, it was announced that Virgin would be sponsoring the new Brawn GP team, with discussions also under way about introducing a less "dirty" fuel in the medium term. After the end of the season and the subsequent purchase of Brawn GP by Mercedes-Benz, Branson invested in an 80% buyout of Manor Grand Prix, with the team being renamed Virgin Racing.

In 2010, Virgin Hotels was launched under the Virgin Group. In February 2018, Branson announced the first Virgin hotel in the UK would open in Edinburgh.

Branson and Tony Fernandes, owner of Air Asia and Lotus F1 Racing, had a bet for the 2010 F1 season where the losing team's boss should work on the winner's airline during a charity flight dressed as a stewardess. Fernandes escaped as the bet winner, as Lotus Racing ended tenth in the championship, while Virgin Racing ended twelfth and last. Branson kept his word after losing the bet, as he served his duty as a stewardess on an Air Asia flight between Perth and Kuala Lumpur on 12 May 2013.

In 2010, Branson became patron of the UK's Gordon Bennett 2010 gas balloon race, which has 16 hydrogen balloons flying across Europe.

In April 2012, Virgin Care commenced a five-year contract for provision of a range of health services which had previously been under the aegis of NHS Surrey, the local primary care trust. By March 2015, Virgin Care was in charge of over 230 services nationwide.

In July 2012, Branson announced plans to build an orbital space launch system, designated LauncherOne.
Four commercial customers have already contracted for launches and two companies are developing standardised satellite buses optimised to the design of LauncherOne, in expectation of business opportunities created by the new smallsat launcher.

In August 2012, when re-tendered the InterCity West Coast franchise was awarded to FirstGroup after a competitive tender process overseen by the Department for Transport. Branson had expressed his concerns about the tender process and questioned the validity of the business plan submitted by FirstGroup. When Virgin Rail lost the contract, Branson said he was convinced the civil servants had "got their maths wrong". In October, after an investigation into the bidding process, the deal was scrapped. The Transport Secretary Patrick McLoughlin announced there were "significant technical flaws" in the process and mistakes had been made by transport staff. Virgin Rail continued to operate the West Coast line until 7 December 2019, when it was replaced by Avanti West Coast.

In September 2014, Branson announced his investment in drone company 3D Robotics stating, "It's amazing to see what a little flying object with a GoPro attached can do. Before they came along the alternative was an expensive helicopter and crew. I'm really excited about the potential 3D Robotics sees in drones. They can do a lot of good in the world, and I hope this affordable technology will give many more people the chance to see our beautiful planet from such a powerful perspective."

In 2014, Branson launched the "Foodpreneur" food and drink-focused start-up competition. Winners were provided with mentorship from Branson, legal support, and brand counseling. The 2014 winners included Proper Beans, Killer Tomato, Sweetpea Pantry and Sweet Virtues. In 2015, the competition expanded to the Virgin StartUp's Foodpreneur Festival. The 2015 winners were given the opportunity to pitch Target Corporation buyers. The 2015 winners included Pip & Nut, Double Dutch Drinks, Harry Bromptons, Cauli Rice and Mallow and Marsh.

In March 2015, Virgin Trains East Coast commenced operating the InterCity East Coast franchise; the company was a joint venture between Stagecoach (90%) and Virgin Group (10%). Due to the line performing below VTEC's expectations, it was announced in May 2018 that the contract would be terminated early by the government. VTEC ceased operating on 23 June 2018 and operations passed to a government-owned operator, London North Eastern Railway.

In November 2015, Branson announced the addition of Moskito Island to the Virgin Limited Edition portfolio. This resort, The Branson Estate on Moskito Island, offers 11 bedrooms for 22 guests.

In 2017, Virgin Group invested in Hyperloop One, developing a strategic partnership between the two. Branson joined the board of directors, and in December 2017, became its chairman. The announced winner of the 2017 Virgin StartUp's Foodpreneur prize was The Snaffling Pig Co., which won a six-week rental space at Intu Lakeside, the retail center with the highest foot traffic in the United Kingdom.

In October 2017, Branson appeared on the Season 9 Premiere of Shark Tank as a guest investor, where he invested in Locker Board, a sustainable line of skateboards invented by 11-year-old, Carson Kropfl. Branson told the young business man that he reminded him of himself. Branson became the richest Shark to have appeared on the show.

In April 2018, Branson announced the acquisition of the Las Vegas based Hard Rock Casino-Hotel with plans to re-brand the property under his Virgin Hotels business. Virgin Hotels Las Vegas opened on 25 March 2021.

In May 2018, it was announced that he would become a partner in a private equity fund that will be co-managed by Metric Capital. The fund will seek out consumer goods firms to invest in.

In September 2018, Branson took part in his fourth Virgin Strive Challenge, where he and a core team travelled more than 2,000 km from Cagliari in Sardinia to the summit of Mont Blanc entirely under human and sail power. It was a gruelling month-long challenge where they hiked, biked and kayaked across Europe and had a near-miss on Mont Blanc when a rockfall rained down on them as they crossed the perilous Gouter Couloir. They raised more than £1m for Holly and Sam Branson's charity Big Change, which supports young people.

In February 2019, Branson helped organise an international benefit concert, Venezuela Aid Live, to bring worldwide attention to the humanitarian crisis and raise funds for humanitarian aid. The concert took place on 22 February in Cúcuta, Colombia, on the Venezuelan border.

2020–present: COVID-19 difficulties 
In March 2020, during the COVID-19 pandemic which saw a dramatic decline in international air travel of around 60% globally, Branson and Virgin attracted criticism by asking staff to take eight weeks' unpaid leave. In response to the global pandemic, Branson put his luxury Necker Island up as collateral for a commercial loan to save Virgin Atlantic from going bust. Branson said: "Over the five decades I have been in business, this is the most challenging time we have ever faced... From a business perspective, the damage to many is unprecedented and the length of the disruption remains worryingly unknown." On 5 May 2020, it was announced that due to the COVID-19 pandemic, the airline would lay off 3000 staff, reduce the fleet size to 35 by the summer of 2022, retire the Boeing 747-400s and would not resume operations from Gatwick following the pandemic.

On 11 July 2021, Richard Branson took a flight with Beth Moses, Sirisha Bandla and Colin Bennett and reached edge of space (86 kilometers or 53 miles) on a Virgin Galactic spacecraft called VSS Unity. This made him the first billionaire founder of a space company to travel to the edge of space.

Failed business ventures 
Branson has been involved in a number of failed business ventures, such as Virgin Cola, Virgin Cars, Virgin Publishing, Virgin Clothing and Virgin Brides. However, Branson holds an optimistic view of failure. He has written: "I suppose the secret to bouncing back is not only to be unafraid of failures but to use them as motivational and learning tools... There's nothing wrong with making mistakes as long as you don't make the same ones over and over again."

World record attempts

Branson made several world record-breaking attempts after 1985, when in the spirit of the Blue Riband he attempted the fastest Atlantic Ocean crossing by ship. His first attempt in the Virgin Atlantic Challenger led to the boat capsizing in British waters and a rescue by Royal Navy helicopter, which received wide media coverage. Some newspapers called for Branson to reimburse the government for the rescue cost. In 1986, in his Virgin Atlantic Challenger II, he beat the record by two hours with sailing expert Daniel McCarthy. A year later his hot air balloon Virgin Atlantic Flyer crossed the Atlantic.

Between 1995 and 1998, Branson, Per Lindstrand, Vladimir Dzhanibekov, Larry Newman, and Steve Fossett made attempts to circumnavigate the globe by balloon. In late 1998, they made a record-breaking flight from Morocco to Hawaii but were unable to complete a global flight before Bertrand Piccard and Brian Jones in Breitling Orbiter 3 in March 1999.

In March 2004, Branson set a record by travelling from Dover to Calais in a Gibbs Aquada in 1 hour, 40 minutes and 6 seconds, the fastest crossing of the English Channel in an amphibious vehicle. The previous record of six hours was set by two Frenchmen.
The cast of Top Gear, Jeremy Clarkson, James May and Richard Hammond, attempted to break this record in 2007 with an amphibious vehicle which they had constructed and, while successfully crossing the channel, did not break Branson's record. After being intercepted by the Coast Guard and asked what their intentions were, Clarkson remarked "...our intentions are to go across the Channel faster than 'Beardy' Branson!". The Coast Guard wished them 'Good luck and Bon Voyage'.

In September 2008, Branson and his children made an unsuccessful attempt at an eastbound record crossing of the Atlantic Ocean under sail in the  sloop Virgin Money. The boat, also known as Speedboat, is owned by NYYC member Alex Jackson, who was a co-skipper on this passage, with Branson and Mike Sanderson. The sloop eventually continued to St. George's, Bermuda.

Television, film and print

Branson has guest starred, usually playing himself, on several television shows, including Friends, Baywatch, Birds of a Feather, Only Fools and Horses, The Day Today, a special episode of the comedy Goodness Gracious Me and Tripping Over. Branson made several appearances during the 1990s on the BBC Saturday morning show Live & Kicking, where he was referred to as 'the pickle man' by comedy act Trev and Simon (in reference to Branston Pickle).

Branson also appears in a cameo early in XTC's "Generals and Majors" video.  He was also the star of a reality television show on Fox called The Rebel Billionaire: Branson's Quest for the Best (2004), in which sixteen contestants were tested for their entrepreneurship and sense of adventure and only lasted one season.

His high public profile often leaves him open as a figure of satire—the 2000 AD series Zenith features a parody of Branson as a supervillain, as the comic's publisher and favoured distributor and the Virgin group were in competition at the time. He is also caricatured in The Simpsons episode "Monty Can't Buy Me Love" as the tycoon Arthur Fortune, as the ballooning megalomaniac Richard Chutney (a pun on Branson, as in Branston Pickle) in Believe Nothing, and voiced himself in "The Princess Guide". The character Grandson Richard 39 in Terry Pratchett's Wings is modelled on Branson.

He has a cameo appearance in several films: Around the World in 80 Days (2004), where he played a hot-air balloon operator, and Superman Returns (2006), where he was credited as a 'Shuttle Engineer' and appeared alongside his son, Sam, with a Virgin Galactic-style commercial suborbital shuttle at the centre of his storyline. He also has a cameo in the James Bond film Casino Royale (2006). Here, he is seen as a passenger going through Miami Airport security check-in and being frisked – several Virgin Atlantic planes appear soon after. British Airways edited out Branson's cameo in their in-flight screening of the movie. He makes a number of brief and disjointed appearances in the documentary Derek and Clive Get the Horn (1979), which follows the exploits of Peter Cook and Dudley Moore recording their final comedy album. Branson and his mother were also featured in the documentary film Lemonade Stories. On the TV series Rove Live in early 2006, Rove McManus and Sir Richard pushed each other into a swimming pool fully clothed live on TV during a "Live at your house" episode.

Branson is a Star Trek fan and named his new spaceship VSS Enterprise in honour of the Star Trek spaceships, and in 2006, reportedly offered actor William Shatner a ride on the inaugural space launch of Virgin Galactic. In an interview in Time magazine, published on 10 August 2009, Shatner claimed that Branson approached him asking how much he would pay for a ride on the spaceship. In response, Shatner asked "how much would you pay me to do it?"

In August 2007, Branson announced on The Colbert Report that he had named a new aircraft Air Colbert. He later doused political satirist and talk show host Stephen Colbert with water from his mug. Branson subsequently took a retaliatory splash from Colbert. The interview quickly ended, with both laughing as shown on the episode aired on Comedy Central on 22 August 2007. The interview was promoted on The Report as the Colbert-Branson Interview Trainwreck. Branson then made a cameo appearance in The Soup, playing an intern working under Joel McHale who had been warned against getting into water fights with Stephen Colbert, and being subsequently fired.

In March 2008, he launched Virgin Mobile in India; during that period, he made a cameo appearance in Bollywood film London Dreams. In July 2010, Branson narrated Australian sailor Jessica Watson's documentary about her solo sailing trip around the world.

In April 2011, Branson appeared on CNN's Mainsail with Kate Winslet. Together they re-enacted a famous scene from the 1997 film Titanic for the cameras. On 17 August 2011, he was featured in the premiere episode of Hulu's first long-form original production entitled, A Day in the Life.

At the 2012 Pride of Britain Awards on ITV on 30 October, Branson, along with Michael Caine, Elton John, Simon Cowell and Stephen Fry, recited Rudyard Kipling's poem "If—" in tribute to the 2012 British Olympic and Paralympics athletes.

In 1998, Branson released his autobiography, titled Losing My Virginity, an international best-seller. Branson was deeply saddened by the disappearance of fellow adventurer Steve Fossett in September 2007; the following month he wrote an article for Time magazine, titled "My Friend, Steve Fossett".

Humanitarian initiatives

In the late 1990s, Branson and musician Peter Gabriel discussed with Nelson Mandela their idea of a small group of leaders working to solve difficult global conflicts. On 18 July 2007, in Johannesburg, South Africa, Mandela announced the formation of a new group, The Elders. Kofi Annan served as Chair of The Elders and Gro Harlem Brundtland as deputy chair. The Elders is funded by a group of donors, including Branson and Gabriel.

In 1999, Branson became a founding sponsor of the International Centre for Missing & Exploited Children ("ICMEC"), the goal of which is to help find missing children, and to stop the exploitation of children, as his mother Eve became a founding member of ICMEC's board of directors.

Through the Carbon War Room, founded in 2009, the entrepreneur sought solutions for global warming and the energy crisis. "We all have a part to play, but I believe entrepreneurs will have a really significant role to play in bringing investment and commercial skills to help develop the new technologies needed to grow a post-carbon economy", he said in his interview with Vision. Through Carbon War Room initiative he has focused efforts on finding sustainable alternatives for three industry sectors: shipping, energy efficiency and aviation and renewable jet fuels.

He also launched Virgin Startup, an official delivery partner for the UK's Start Up Loans programme. Through this new organisation, he provided loans to entrepreneurs between the ages of 18 and 30 UK-wide. A pilot of the scheme, which ran over 11 months, injected £600,000 into 100 businesses.

Branson's other work in South Africa includes the Branson School of Entrepreneurship, set up in 2005 as a partnership between Virgin Unite, the non-profit foundation of Virgin, and entrepreneur Taddy Blecher, the founder of CIDA City Campus, a university in Johannesburg. The school aims to improve economic growth in South Africa by supporting start-ups and micro-enterprises with skills, mentors, services, networks and finance arrangements. Fundraising activity to support the school is achieved by The Sunday Times Fast Track 100, sponsored by Virgin Group, at its yearly event, where places to join Richard Branson on trips to South Africa to provide coaching and mentoring to students are auctioned to attendees. In 2009, Jason Luckhurst and Boyd Kershaw of Practicus, Martin Ainscough of the Ainscough Group and Matthew Riley of Daisy Communications helped raise £150,000 through the auction.

In March 2008, Branson hosted an environmental gathering at his private island, Necker Island, in the Caribbean with several entrepreneurs, celebrities, and world leaders. They discussed global warming-related problems, hoping that the meeting would be a precursor to future discussions regarding similar problems. Former British Prime Minister Tony Blair, Wikipedia co-founder Jimmy Wales, and Larry Page of Google were in attendance.

On 8 May 2009, Branson took over Mia Farrow's hunger strike for three days in protest of the Sudanese government expulsion of aid groups from the Darfur region. In 2010, he and the Nduna Foundation (founded by Amy Robbins), and Humanity United (an organization backed by Pam Omidyar, the wife of eBay founder Pierre Omidyar) founded Enterprise Zimbabwe.

Branson is a signatory of Global Zero campaign, a non-profit international initiative for the elimination of all nuclear weapons worldwide. Since its launch in Paris in December 2008, Global Zero has grown to 300 leaders, including current and former heads of state, national security officials and military commanders, and 400,000 citizens worldwide; developed a practical step-by-step plan to eliminate nuclear weapons; launched an international student campaign with 75 campus chapters in eight countries; and produced a documentary film, Countdown to Zero, in partnership with Lawrence Bender and Participant Media.

Since 2010, Branson has served as a Commissioner on the Broadband Commission for Digital Development, a UN initiative which promotes universal access to broadband services. In 2011, Branson served on the Global Commission on Drug Policy with former political and cultural leaders of Latin America and elsewhere, "in a bid to boost the effort to achieve more humane and rational drug laws."

In December 2013, Branson urged companies to boycott Uganda because of its "anti-homosexuality bill". Branson stated that it would be "against my conscience to support this country...governments must realize that people should be able to love whoever they want."

In 2014, Branson joined forces with African Wildlife Foundation and partner WildAid for the "Say No" Campaign, an initiative to bring public awareness to the issues of wildlife poaching and trafficking.

Branson is an opponent of the death penalty, stating: "the death penalty is always cruel, barbaric and inhumane. It has no place in the world." In 2015, Branson released a letter in support of American inmate Richard Glossip on the day he was due to be executed, and in 2021 Branson was among the public figures who called on Singapore to halt the execution of Nagaenthran K. Dharmalingam, a Malaysian drug trafficker who was convicted and sentenced to Singapore's death row for heroin trafficking. After Nagaenthran was executed by hanging at Changi Prison, Branson expressed disappointment in Singapore for its "relentless machinery of death" since it left "no room for decency, dignity, compassion, or mercy". In October 2022, the Singapore Ministry of Home Affairs invited Branson to Singapore for a live televised debate on Singapore’s approach towards drugs and the death penalty with K Shanmugam, Singapore’s Minister for Home Affairs and Law. Branson rejected the offer.

In October 2018, Branson spoke out for Jamal Khashoggi, a Saudi journalist who was killed by Saudi authorities in the Saudi consulate in Istanbul, Turkey by suspending his advisory role from Saudi Arabia's biggest Red Sea tourism project. He issued a statement saying, "The disappearance of journalist Jamal Khashoggi, if proved true, would clearly change the ability of any of us in the West to do business with the Saudi Government."

On 1 December 2020 Virgin Orbit launched The Patti Grace Smith Fellowship, designed to offer paid work experience and mentorship in the aerospace industry for 'extraordinary Black students.'

Climate change pledge

In 2006, Branson made a high-profile pledge to invest $3 billion toward addressing global warming over the course of the following decade. However, author and activist Naomi Klein has criticised Branson for contributing "well under $300 million" as of 2014, far below the originally stated goal. Additionally, Klein says Virgin airlines' greenhouse gas emissions increased considerably in the years following his pledge.

B Team 
Branson is the Co-founder of the B Team, a global nonprofit organization that was founded in 2013 by a group of business leaders who are committed to using their influence to drive positive change and promote sustainable business practice. The B Team has several focus areas, including climate action, human rights, and responsible tax practices. The organisation also advocates for gender equality and diversity and inclusion in the workplace, recognizing that these issues are critical to achieving sustainable business practices.

Politics
In the 1980s, Branson was briefly given the post of "litter Tsar" by Margaret Thatcher—charged with "keeping Britain tidy". During the BBC Coverage of the 1997 UK General Election, Branson was interviewed at the Labour Party celebrations at the Royal Festival Hall. In 2005, he declared that there were only negligible differences between the two main parties on economic matters. He was suggested as a candidate for Mayor of London before the first 2000 election, with polls indicating he would be a viable candidate, but he did not express interest.

In March 2015, Branson said that almost all drug use should be decriminalised in the UK, following the example of Portugal.

Branson supported continuing British membership of the European Union and was opposed to the 2016 referendum. On 28 June 2016, interviewed for ITV's Good Morning Britain, he said that his company had lost a third of its value as a result of the referendum result and that a planned venture, employing over 3,000 people, which he had announced before the referendum, had been shelved. He gave his backing for a second referendum. Branson endorsed Democratic candidate Hillary Clinton in the run-up for the 2016 US presidential election.

Branson openly criticised the Philippine drug war marred by allegations of extrajudicial killings. In September 2016, he, along with former United Nations High Commissioner for Human Rights Louise Arbour and former Brazilian president Fernando Henrique Cardoso, wrote a letter to then-Philippine president Rodrigo Duterte calling on his government to halt the killings and develop evidence-based policies to address the Philippines' drug situation.

After expressing his opposition to the death penalty for crimes such as drug trafficking, in October 2022, Branson was invited by Singapore's government to participate in a live television debate regarding this country's approach to drugs and the death penalty. However, Branson declined this invitation, stating that such debates often focus on the personalities rather than the issue itself.

Honours and awards

 In 1992, Branson received the Golden Plate Award of the American Academy of Achievement.
 In 1993, Branson was awarded an honorary degree of Doctor of Technology from Loughborough University.
 In the New Years Honours list dated 30 December 1999, Elizabeth II signified her intention to confer the honour of Knight Bachelor on him for his "services to entrepreneurship". 
 He was knighted by Charles, Prince of Wales on 30 March 2000 at an investiture in Buckingham Palace. 
 Also in 2000, Branson received the Tony Jannus Award for his accomplishments in commercial air transportation.
 In 2000, Branson was inducted into the International Air & Space Hall of Fame at the San Diego Air & Space Museum.
 Branson appears at No. 85 on the 2002 list of 100 Greatest Britons on the BBC and voted for by the public. Branson was also ranked in 2007's Time magazine list of the 100 Most Influential People in The World. On 7 December 2007, United Nations Secretary General Ban Ki-Moon presented Branson with the United Nations Correspondents Association Citizen of the World Award for his support for environmental and humanitarian causes.
 On 24 January 2011, Branson was awarded the German Media Prize (organised by "Media Control Charts"), previously handed to former US president Bill Clinton and the Dalai Lama. 
 On 14 November 2011, Branson was awarded the ISTA Prize by the International Space Transport Association in The Hague for his pioneering achievements in the development of suborbital transport systems with "Virgin Galactic".
 On 11 February 2012, Branson was honoured with the National Academy of Recording Arts and Sciences' President's Merit Award for his contributions to the music industry.
 On 2 June 2013, Branson received an honorary degree of Doctor Honoris Causa from Kaunas Technology University in Kaunas, Lithuania. 
 On 15 May 2014, Branson received the 2014 Business for Peace Award, awarded annually by the Business for Peace Foundation in Oslo, Norway.
 On 21 September 2014, Branson was recognized by The Sunday Times as the most admired business person over the last five decades. 
 On 9 October 2014, Branson was named as the No. 1 LGBT ally by the OUTstanding organisation. 
 On 29 October 2015, Branson was listed by UK-based company Richtopia at number 1 in the list of 100 Most Influential British Entrepreneurs. 
 In October 2015, Branson received the International Crisis Group Chairman's Award at the United Nations Development Programme's in Pursuit of Peace Awards Dinner.
 On 16 October 2018, Branson received a star on the Hollywood Walk of Fame under the category of recording for co-founding Virgin Records. The Hollywood Chamber of Commerce placed his star at 6764 Hollywood Boulevard in Los Angeles, United States.

Tax evasion
In 1971, Branson was convicted and briefly jailed for tax evasion, having fraudulently obtained export documents for records to be sold on the domestic market to avoid paying Purchase Tax. Customs officials caught onto the scheme and executed a sting operation, marking records bought for the international market with invisible ink and subsequently buying them on the domestic market. Branson was advised of the sting by an anonymous tip-off and attempted to dispose of the evidence, but this was unsuccessful.

Branson's business empire is owned by a complicated series of offshore trusts and companies. The Sunday Times stated that his wealth is calculated at £3 billion; if he were to retire to his Caribbean island and liquidate all of this, he would pay relatively little in tax. Branson has been criticised for his business strategy, and has been accused of being a carpetbagger. Branson responded that he is living on Necker for health rather than tax reasons.

In 2013, Branson described himself as a "tax exile", having saved millions in tax by ending his mainland British residency and living in the British Virgin Islands. This was echoed by the then Shadow Chancellor of the Exchequer, Labour's John McDonnell, in 2016, amid calls for his knighthood to be revoked.

Personal life
Branson married Kristen Tomassi in 1972 and divorced her in 1979. They had no children together. In 1976, Branson met Joan Templeman and later began a relationship with her. Three children were born during the course of the relationship: daughter Clare Sarah (b.1979)  who died only four days after birth; another daughter Holly (b. 1981) and a son Sam (b. 1985). Branson and Templeman got married in 1989 on Necker Island.

In 2017, Branson's Necker Island home was left uninhabitable after Hurricane Irma. It was the second time the Necker Island home had been severely damaged after the building caught fire when it was struck by lightning caused by Hurricane Irene in 2011. Branson's mother Eve died from COVID-19 complications in January 2021 at the age of 96. A celebration of her life was posted online by her son.

In 2007, Branson was ordained as a minister by the Universal Life Church Monastery to conduct an on-flight wedding as part of a marketing effort for domestic flights in the USA on Virgin America airline. From 2013 to 2017, he served as President of the Old Stoic Society of Stowe School.

In November 2017, singer Antonia Jenae, a backing singer for Joss Stone, claimed Branson sexually assaulted her at Necker Island by "putting his head between her cleavage and making boat engine noises", a practice that, when performed consensually, is known as motorboating. A spokesperson for Branson confirmed to The Sun newspaper that members of the band had been invited for a party on the island in 2010, but that he and friends and family in attendance had "no recollection" of the events and that "there would never have been any intention to offend or make anyone feel uncomfortable. Richard apologises if anyone felt that way."

Branson is an experienced kitesurfer, and set two world records in the sport. The first was as the oldest person to kitesurf across the English Channel. Then in 2014 he broke the Guinness World Record for most people riding a surfboard by kiting with three women attached to him, including professional kiteboarder Susi Mai and entrepreneur Alison Di Spaltro. Also an avid cyclist, in August 2016, he was injured while riding his bicycle in the British Virgin Islands, resulting in torn ligaments and a cracked cheek.

Influences
Branson has stated in a number of interviews that he has been much influenced by non-fiction books. He most commonly mentions Nelson Mandela's autobiography, Long Walk to Freedom, explaining that Mandela was "one of the most inspiring men I have ever met and had the honour to call my friend." Owing to his interest in humanitarian and ecological issues, Branson also lists Al Gore's best-selling book, An Inconvenient Truth, and The Revenge of Gaia by James Lovelock amongst his favourites. According to Branson's book, Screw It, Let's Do It: Lessons in Life, he is also a fan of Jung Chang's Wild Swans and Antony Beevor's Stalingrad. In fiction, Branson has long admired the character Peter Pan, and in 2006, he founded Virgin Comics LLC, stating that Virgin Comics will give "a whole generation of young, creative thinkers a voice".

Bibliography
 
 
 
 
 
 
 
 
 
 
 
 Also published as: The Virgin Way: If It's Not Fun, It's Not Worth Doing and The Virgin Way: Everything I Know About Leadership

Notes

References

External links

 Sir Richard Branson at The Bail Project
 Branson's 2nd island in Architectural Digest
 
 Branson's blog on virgin.com
 
 Branson's Forbes Profile
 Branson interview on BBC Radio 4's Desert Island Discs, 1990

1950 births
Living people
Members of the Order of the British Empire
20th-century British businesspeople
21st-century British businesspeople
20th-century English non-fiction writers
20th-century English male writers
21st-century English writers
Britannia Trophy winners
British music industry executives
British people of Anglo-Indian descent
British technology company founders
Businesspeople awarded knighthoods
Businesspeople from London
Businesspeople in aviation
English autobiographers
English aviators
English balloonists
English billionaires
English chief executives
English company founders
20th-century English criminals
English investors
English male non-fiction writers
English non-fiction writers
English philanthropists
Formula E team owners
Formula One team owners
Giving Pledgers
21st-century philanthropists
Knights Bachelor
People with dyslexia
People educated at Scaitcliffe School
People educated at Stowe School
People from Blackheath, London
People in the space industry
Rugby league chairmen and investors
Segrave Trophy recipients
Space advocates
20th-century squatters
Virgin Group people
Writers from London
British aerospace businesspeople
People who have flown in suborbital spaceflight
People with attention deficit hyperactivity disorder